Teodor Andrzej Potocki (13 February 1664 – 12 December 1738) was a Polish nobleman (szlachcic), Primate of Poland, interrex in 1733.

Teodor was Rector of Przemyśl and canon of Kraków since 1687, Bishop of Chełmno since 1699 and Bishop of Warmia (Ermland) since 1711. In 1722 Teodor became Archbishop of Gniezno and Primate of Poland.

He became interrex after the death of Augustus II of Poland and led the election of a new king in Wola. In 1733 he declared and crowned Stanisław I Leszczyński as the successor to Augustus II on the Polish throne. He supported Leszczyński during the following War of the Polish Succession.

Teodor was a protector of the Jesuits order and benefactor of churches, monasteries and palaces.

References

External links
List of Primates of Poland 

Ecclesiastical senators of the Polish–Lithuanian Commonwealth
1664 births
1738 deaths
Archbishops of Gniezno
Bishops of Warmia
Polish interreges
Teodor
18th-century Roman Catholic archbishops in the Polish–Lithuanian Commonwealth
Recipients of the Order of the White Eagle (Poland)